Batrachomatus nannup is a species of diving beetle in the family, Dytiscidae, first described as Allomatus nannup in 1978 by Chris H.S. Watts. The holotype was collected in Bridgetown, Western Australia. In a generic revision in 2013, Lars Hendrich and Michael Balke synonymised Allomatus Mouchamps, 1964 with Batrachomatus Clark, 1863, thus changing the species name.

References

Dytiscidae
Taxa described in 1978
Fauna of Western Australia